Bandar-e Mahshahr is a city and capital of Mahshahr County, Khuzestan Province, Iran.

Mahshahr has two universities. Islamic Azad University of Mahshahr and Amirkabir University of Technology, Mahshahr campus. Both universities concentrate on engineering programs, especially petroleum and petrochemical engineering.

Demographics 
Most of its people spoke a dialect that was a mixture of Southern Luri and Bushehri, that is still spoken by some elderly people and by younger generations mostly in rural area (the dialect though still thrives in Hendijan and especially Genaaveh). But now Mahshahrians are mainly Persian-speaking. Local Persians are mostly of Behbahani, Qanavati, and Bandari families. There is also a local Arabic-speaking minority whose roots go back to Qabban in Iraq.

Climate

2019 Protests

In the 2019 Iranian fuel protests, Amnesty International confirmed that security forces killed 14 protestors in Bandar-e Mahshahr, a death toll higher than that of larger cities such as Tehran or Shiraz; the New York Times reports between 40 and 100 protestors were killed in Mahshahr.

Port and Special Economic Zone
The port of Bandar-e Mahshahr is immediately adjacent to the East of the port of Bandar-e Emam Khomeyni. It is specialized in oil and petrochemical products exports. It includes a Special economic zone used by the National Iranian Petrochemical Company and the National Petrochemical Company (NPC), the Special industrial economic zones 'Petzone'.

The port of Bandar-e Mahshahr is mostly used by tanker ships and is accessible through the same channel as the port of Bandar-e Emam Khomeyni, i.e. the 42 miles long, 20 meter deep Khor Musa channel,

Footnotes

References

Populated places in Mahshahr County
Cities in Khuzestan Province
Port cities and towns in Iran